Markus Ballmert (born 27 November 1993) is a German professional footballer who plays as a defender for SV Meppen.

References

External links
 

1993 births
Living people
Footballers from Frankfurt
German footballers
Association football defenders
2. Bundesliga players
3. Liga players
Regionalliga players
FSV Frankfurt players
Hannover 96 II players
SV Meppen players